Ricardo Jorge Vaz Tê (born 1 October 1986) is a Portuguese professional footballer who plays as a forward.

Vaz Tê has previously played for English clubs Bolton Wanderers, Hull City, Barnsley and West Ham United, Greek club Panionios, Scottish Premier League club Hibernian, Turkish side Akhisar Belediyespor, and Portuguese club Portimonense.

Early life
Vaz Tê was born in Lisbon, but moved a year later to live with his father in Guinea-Bissau, where he remained until he was 11 years old. He returned to Portugal and received professional coaching at SC Farense. Vaz Tê played youth football with his local club Real Massamá, a team which also included Manchester United winger Nani. Nani went to play for Sporting CP while Vaz Tê left for England to play for Bolton Wanderers. They also represented the Portugal Under-21s.

Club career

Bolton Wanderers
Vaz Tê went on trial with Bolton Wanderers in 2003 and he was signed on a three-year youth academy contract. He made such an impression at youth level that Vaz Tê quickly found himself part of the Bolton first-team squad. He made his debut in their FA Cup tie with Tranmere Rovers in January 2004. Just over two months later, he made his Premier League debut in a 2–0 defeat at Middlesbrough. He made his first full start in the game with Manchester United at Old Trafford in December 2004.

In 2005–06, Vaz Tê was again involved in first-team action, starting 7 games and coming on as a substitute in another 22. He scored 6 goals in all competitions, one of which a late equaliser shortly after coming on as a substitute on 24 November 2005, at Vitória de Guimarães. In March 2007, Vaz Tê joined Hull City on a month's loan from Bolton.

He had an unlucky beginning to the 2007–08 season, damaging his ligaments on the opening day. He only appeared in one more game throughout that season, a 0–1 defeat to Sporting Lisbon in the UEFA Cup in which Bolton Manager Gary Megson played mostly a reserve team. In August 2008, there was confusion regarding the player, when it was widely reported that he had signed for Racing de Santander on loan as part of a swap deal that would see fellow striker Euzebiusz Smolarek go the other way. However, although Smolarek did join Bolton, the Portuguese striker also remained at the club. He made only two appearances in the 2008–09 season and none in the 2009–10 season, as he required four operations on his right knee and one on his left knee. On 11 May 2010, Vaz Tê was released by Bolton Wanderers.

Panionios
On 30 June 2010 it was reported that Vaz Tê had signed a three-year deal with Greek Super League club Panionios. In December 2010, after less than six months in Greece, it was announced that Vaz Tê and Panionios had come to an agreement to mutually terminate his contract. Panionios had suffered financial problems, which meant that Vaz Tê went four months without receiving any pay.

Hibernian
Vaz Tê went on trial with Scottish Premier League club Hibernian in February 2011 and manager Colin Calderwood stated that both parties were in discussions about a contract. The signing was confirmed on 28 February. Vaz Tê made his debut for the club in a 1–1 draw against St Johnstone on 5 March as a substitute. He scored one goal for Hibs, in an Edinburgh derby against Hearts. His contract was not renewed at the end of the season. Vaz Tê later said that he had played for Hibs for "no money", but had chosen to go there due to the "visibility" of Scottish football in neighbouring England.

Barnsley
Vaz Tê went on trial with Football League Championship club Barnsley in July 2011, every other Championship club having rejected that opportunity. He impressed the club management and scored a goal in a friendly against Grimsby Town. On 3 August 2011 he agreed a contract with Barnsley until the end of the 2011–12 season. He scored his first goal for Barnsley in a 2–0 win against Burnley on 18 October 2011. Vaz Tê scored his fifth Barnsley goal on 6 December 2011 against Crystal Palace after only 8.5 seconds, the fastest goal in Barnsley history. He scored again later in the game to give Barnsley a 2–1 win. On 31 December, Vaz Tê scored a hat-trick in a 4–1 win against Leeds United, after coming on as a substitute. Sky Sports reported on 1 January 2012 that Vaz Tê had rejected Barnsley's offer of a new contract. He scored both of the Barnsley goals in a 4–2 defeat against Swansea City in an FA Cup third round tie.

West Ham United

Vaz Tê signed for then Championship club West Ham United on 31 January 2012, for an undisclosed fee on a -year deal with an option for a third year. Vaz Tê made his debut for the club, coming on as an 89th-minute substitute for Carlton Cole in the London derby against Millwall on 4 February. The game finished 2–1 to West Ham United. On 21 February 2012, Vaz Tê scored his first goal for the Hammers, in a 4–1 victory at Blackpool. Nicky Maynard and Gary O'Neil also scored their first professional goals for the club. Vaz Tê scored his first hat-trick for West Ham on 14 April 2012, in West Ham United's 6–0 home victory against Brighton & Hove Albion. West Ham finished 3rd behind Southampton entering the play-offs against Cardiff City. They won the first leg at the Cardiff City Stadium 2–0 and the second leg 3–0 at the Upton Park, with Vaz Tê scoring the second goal of the second game. West Ham progressed to the play-off final with a 5–0 aggregate victory. In the play-off final at Wembley on 19 May 2012, Vaz Tê scored the winning goal in the 87th minute against Blackpool. It was the 24th goal Vaz Tê had scored in the 2011–12 season.

He was in the starting line-up from the beginning of the 2012–13 season scoring his first Premier League goal for West Ham in their 2–1 away win at QPR on 1 October 2012. In the very next game, on 6 October 2012 at home to Arsenal, Vaz Tê dislocated his shoulder, an injury which kept him out of the team for nearly 3 months. Vaz Tê returned to the side on 29 December in an away game at Reading, he was brought on with 23 minutes remaining and his side down 1–0 and went on to miss a glaring opportunity to draw the match, as West Ham lost. Sam Allardyce said it was one of the "easiest" chances to score in the Premier League.

He started the 2013–14 season as a 90th-minute substitute, replacing Joe Cole, in a 2–0 home win against Cardiff City. He scored his first goal of the season in a League Cup second round fixture against Cheltenham Town on 27 August 2013, when he scored the opening goal from a free-kick in 42nd minute of the match, which ended a 2–1 win for West Ham. He later received a Goal of the Month club award for that goal.
After the Cheltenham win, on 28 August 2013, Vaz Tê handed in a transfer request. His statement regarding this said, "The statistics are evident to all but, despite this, it has been made obvious to myself and my representatives that I am not in the manager's plans. Therefore, it is with a heavy heart that I submit a transfer request and look to join a club where my approach to the game will be appreciated." He has remained at West Ham for at least until the winter transfer period and has committed himself to the club. Following his transfer request Vaz Te played four games in September 2013, scoring once and three games in October scoring twice, in games against Tottenham Hotspur and Manchester City. These proved to be his last goals for the club. In his next game, on 27 October 2013, he dislocated his shoulder against Swansea City. He did not return to the first team until 15 April 2014 when he played 12 minutes against Arsenal in a 1–3 defeat.

In the 2014–15 season he was rarely picked by manager Sam Allardyce making only four league appearances and one in the League Cup. His last game came on 22 November 2014 in a 2–1 away defeat to Everton and on 17 January 2015, his contract was terminated by the club.

Akhisar Belediyespor
On 18 January 2015, Vaz Tê joined Turkish Süper Lig side Akhisar Belediyespor on a six-month contract. He played just 14 games; scoring on five occasions.

Charlton Athletic
On 13 November 2015, Vaz Tê signed for Charlton Athletic on a free transfer until the end of the season. However, he was released from his contract in February 2016.

China
On 14 July 2017, Vaz Tê transferred to Chinese Super League side Henan Jianye. Vaz Tê transferred to China League One side Qingdao Huanghai in February 2019.

Portimonense
After his stint in China, Vaz Tê moved back to Portugal, signing for Primeira Liga club Portimonense. Following the end of the 2020/21 season, Vaz Tê had his contract mutually terminated and was released by the Portuguese club.

International career
In the summer of 2005, Vaz Tê took part in the annual Toulon tournament scoring a hat-trick for Portugal U-20s, in their game with South Korea. He then played regularly for the Portugal under-21 team. Vaz Tê could still play for Guinea-Bissau, as he has not yet been selected by Portugal.

Career statistics

Honours
West Ham United
Football League Championship play-offs: 2012

Qingdao Huanghai
China League One: 2019

References

External links

Stats and profile at futebol365.pt

1986 births
Living people
Portuguese people of Bissau-Guinean descent
Portuguese footballers
Portuguese expatriate footballers
Association football forwards
Portugal under-21 international footballers
Portugal youth international footballers
Footballers from Lisbon
Real S.C. players
S.C. Farense players
Bolton Wanderers F.C. players
Hull City A.F.C. players
Panionios F.C. players
Hibernian F.C. players
Barnsley F.C. players
West Ham United F.C. players
Henan Songshan Longmen F.C. players
Qingdao F.C. players
Akhisarspor footballers
Charlton Athletic F.C. players
Black Portuguese sportspeople
Portimonense S.C. players
Premier League players
English Football League players
Scottish Premier League players
Chinese Super League players
China League One players
Süper Lig players
Primeira Liga players
Super League Greece players
Expatriate footballers in Greece
Expatriate footballers in Scotland
Expatriate footballers in England
Expatriate footballers in Turkey
Expatriate footballers in China
Portuguese expatriate sportspeople in Greece
Portuguese expatriate sportspeople in Scotland
Portuguese expatriate sportspeople in England
Portuguese expatriate sportspeople in Turkey
Portuguese expatriate sportspeople in China